"Slow Motion" is a song by American singer Trey Songz from Trigga Reloaded, released on January 20, 2015. It has reached number 26 on the US Billboard Hot 100.

Music video
A music video for the popular song directed by Dre Films was released on February 14, 2015. It features his longtime girlfriend and model Tanaya Henry and compares to Usher's "Dive". In the beginning of the music video, Trey picks Tanya up, his love interest, and heads to the club, but changes his mind and decides to take her back to his house instead. In no time, he removes her article of clothing, pours her a drink and make out by the fireplace and on the balcony. Toward the end of the video, Trey takes off his shirt, while his model co-star and love interest Tanya Henry is chilling and smoking a joint and start make love.

Charts

Weekly charts

Year-end charts

Certifications

References

Trey Songz songs
2015 singles
2015 songs
Songs written by Charlie Puth
Atlantic Records singles
Songs written by Trey Songz
Songs written by Jacob Kasher